Mark Farrell may refer to:
 Mark Farrell (comedian) (born 1968), Canadian comedian and writer
 Mark Farrell (tennis) (1953–2018), British tennis player
 Mark Farrell (politician) (born 1974), mayor of San Francisco